The United States Air Force's 226th Combat Communications Group is a combat communications headquarters unit located at Abston Air National Guard Station in Montgomery, Alabama, USA.  The Group is one of two Air National Guard Combat Communications Groups nationwide, which together constitute over 60% of the U.S. Air Force's tactical communications capability. The 226 CCG is one of three major organizations that make up the Alabama Air National Guard.

Mission
The mission of the 226th Combat Communications Group is to command, organize, equip, train and administer assigned and attached forces to ensure complete mission readiness in support of emergency USAF requirements, and to provide timely and reliable communications and engineering and installation in support of state emergencies.

History
The 226 CCG was originally organized on 18 June 1954 as part of the 225th Radio Relay Squadron.  The 225th was initially organized in March 1953 in Greenville, Mississippi, as part of the Mississippi Air National Guard.  The unit was formally organized on 18 June 1954, and was eventually transferred to the Alabama Air National Guard and relocated to Gadsden.

On 22 February 1971, an element of the 225th was reorganized as the Headquarters, 226th Mobile Communications Group and allotted to the National Guard Bureau.  (The remainder of the 225th eventually became the 225th Combat Communications Squadron.) The unit received federal recognition on 29 September 1971.  In 1986, the 226th was renamed, becoming the 226th Combat Communications Group.

The group headquarters moved to Abston Air National Guard Station in February 1996.

The 226th gained seven additional squadrons on 1 October 2013, when the 281st Combat Communications Group was inactivated (30 September 2013).

Lineage
 Constituted as the 226th Mobile Communications Group and allotted to the Air National Guard on 22 February 1971
 Federally recognized on 13 September 1971
 Redesignated 226th Combat Communications Group on 1 April 1976
 Redesignated 226th Combat Information Systems Group on 1 July 1985
 Redesignated 226th Combat Communications Group on 1 October 1986

Assignments
 Major Command/Gaining Command
 Air National Guard/Air Force Communications Service (later Air Force Communications Command) (1971–1992)
 Air National Guard/Air Combat Command (1992–2008)
 Air National Guard/Air Force Space Command (2008–2018)
 Air National Guard/Air Combat Command (2018–Present)

Components
 Currently assigned / aligned
 156th Combat Communications Squadron – Muñiz Air National Guard Base, Carolina, Puerto Rico
 224th Joint Communications Support Squadron – Brunswick ANGS, Brunswick, Georgia
 232d Combat Communications Squadron – Abston ANGS, Montgomery, Alabama
 263d Combat Communications Squadron – New London ANGS, New London, North Carolina
 265th Combat Communications Squadron – South Portland ANGS, South Portland, Maine
 269th Combat Communications Squadron – Springfield ANGS, Springfield, Ohio
 271st Combat Communications Squadron – Fort Indiantown Gap, Annville, Pennsylvania
 280th Special Operations Communications Squadron – Dothan Regional Airport ANGS, Dothan, Alabama
 282d Combat Communications Squadron – North Smithfield ANGS, North Smithfield, Rhode Island
 283d Combat Communications Squadron – Dobbins ARB, Georgia
 290th Joint Communications Support Squadron – MacDill AFB, Florida

 Previously assigned / aligned
 114th Combat Communications Squadron – Patrick Space Force Base, Florida
 115th Air Control Squadron – Dothan, Alabama
 225th Combat Communications Squadron – Gadsden, Alabama
 228th Combat Communications Squadron – McGhee-Tyson ANGB, Tennessee
 240th Combat Communications Squadron – McEntire ANGB, South Carolina
 241st Engineering Installation Squadron – Chattanooga, Tennessee
 245th Air Traffic Control Squadron – McEntire ANGB, South Carolina
 267th Combat Communications Squadron – Joint Base Cape Cod (formerly Otis ANGB), Massachusetts
 285th Combat Communications Squadron (? – 3 March 2012) – St. Croix, U.S. Virgin Islands

Stations
 Martin Air National Guard Station, Gadsden, Alabama, 13 September 1971
 Abston Air National Guard Station, Montgomery, Alabama, February 1996 – present

Awards and campaigns

Equipment operated

References
 Explanatory notes

 Citations

External links
 Alabama ANG: 187th Fighter Wing

Combat Communications 0226
Combat Communications 0226
Military units and formations in Alabama